Persatuan Sepakbola Bangsa Indonesia Blitar, commonly known as PSBI Blitar is an Indonesian football club based in Blitar Regency, East Java. They currently compete in the Liga 3.

References

External links
PSBI Blitar at Liga-Indonesia.co.id
PSBI Blitar Official Site
 

Football clubs in Indonesia
Association football clubs established in 1928
Football clubs in East Java
1928 establishments in the Dutch East Indies